SS Minnie M. Fiske was a Liberty ship built in the United States during World War II. She was named after Minnie M. Fiske, a late nineteenth and early twentieth century actress that spearheaded the fight against the Theatrical Syndicate for the sake of artistic freedom.

Construction
Minnie M. Fiske was laid down on 8 December 1943, under a Maritime Commission (MARCOM) contract, MC hull 1547, by J.A. Jones Construction, Panama City, Florida; she was launched on 29 January 1944.

History
She was allocated to American South African Line, Inc., on 15 March 1944. On 28 February 1947, she was laid up in the National Defense Reserve Fleet, in Astoria, Oregon. On 10 June 1955, she was withdrawn from the fleet to be loaded with grain under the "Grain Program 1955", she returned loaded on 20 June 1955. She was withdrawn from the fleet on 11 July 1963, to be emptied, she returned 17 July 1963. On 30 March 1966, she was sold for $48,001 to Zidell Explorations, Inc., for scrapping. She was removed from the fleet on 16 June 1966.

References

Bibliography

 
 
 
 
 

 

Liberty ships
Ships built in Panama City, Florida
1944 ships
Astoria Reserve Fleet
Astoria Reserve Fleet Grain Program